Nedelya Petkova (1826–1894)  was a Bulgarian education pioneer.  In 1859 she began teaching girls and developed this into a school system for girls across the Bulgarian part of the Ottoman Empire, with hundreds of girls attending classes.

Biography
She was born on 13 August 1826 in Sopot, Plovdiv Province.
Nedelya Petkova, was also known as Grandma Nedelya or Baba Nedelya.  She studied in the monastery school of the “Holy presentation of the Blessed Virgin” convent in the town of Sopot. Later she was self-educated.

Nedelya Petkova began as a teacher in Sofia (1858-1861), Samokov (1862-1864), Kyustendil (1864-1865), Prilep (1865-1866), Ohrid (1868-1869) and Veles (1870-1871). She later founded the first Bulgarian girls’ schools in Prilep, Bitolya, Veles, and Thessaloniki.

After the Liberation, she lived in Kyustendil (1878) and in Sofia (1879). In 1883 she settled in Rakitovo.
Government officials tried to stop her and she was arrested and her home searched for seditious books. Although put on trial she was released through lack of evidence and continued her campaign to educate women until her death on 1 January 1894.

Legacy
Nedelya Point on Livingston Island in the South Shetland Islands, Antarctica is named after Nedelya Petkova.

References

19th Century Women See 1826. Accessed March 2008
Nedelya Petkova (1826-94) Bulgarian Tourist Information Office. Historical persons. Accessed March 2008
Sopot Convent at  Bulgaria Monasteries website. Accessed March 2008.

1826 births
1894 deaths
Bulgarian educators
19th-century Bulgarian people
Bulgarian feminists
People from Sopot, Plovdiv Province